The following is a list comprising the seventy-eight tallest skyscrapers in the U.S. state of Michigan.  Skyscrapers are listed in descending order, from first to seventy-first.  This tallest seventy-one includes completed, existing, free-standing skyscrapers.  Height does not take into account subterranean floors, antennas, or other non-structural additions. There is also a timeline of the tallest buildings in Michigan and a timeline of the tallest skyscrapers. The Renaissance Center in Detroit, Michigan is the second tallest all-hotel skyscraper in the Western Hemisphere.

Tallest skyscrapers

Timeline of tallest buildings

The following is a list of the tallest buildings in the U.S. state of Michigan on a year-to-year basis.  The chart below shows the building, years as tallest, and its height.

Timeline of tallest skyscrapers

The following is a list of the tallest skyscrapers in the U.S. state of Michigan on a year-to-year basis.  The chart below shows the skyscraper, its height, when it was completed, how long it was the tallest, and what skyscraper surpassed it. The Frank & Seder (1881) is considered Detroit's oldest existing iron-framed tall building. The Hammond Building (1889) is considered Detroit's first steel-framed skyscraper, though it is now demolished. Detroit's oldest existing steel-framed skyscraper is the 12-story United Way Community Services Building (1895) at 1212 Griswold, originally known as the Chamber of Commerce Building.

See also
List of tallest buildings in Detroit
List of tallest buildings in Grand Rapids
List of tallest buildings by U.S. state
List of tallest buildings in the United States

Notes

References 
General
Emporis.com
Specific

External links 

Michigan
Michigan
Tallest buildings